Greiner  may refer to:

 Greiner (surname), a surname
 USS Greiner (DE-37), an Evarts-class destroyer escort

See also

 Grainer
 Greener (disambiguation)
 Greiner-Petter-Memm